Gérard Tremblay (born 31 July 1950 in Le Mans, France) is a French former racing driver.

References

1950 births
Living people
French racing drivers
24 Hours of Le Mans drivers
World Sportscar Championship drivers
Sportspeople from Le Mans
20th-century French people

Nürburgring 24 Hours drivers
24H Series drivers